Kim Soo-jung is a South Korean cartoonist and animator best known as the creator of Dooly the Little Dinosaur.  His debut occurred in 1975 after he won the Hanguk Ilbo daily comics contest. In April 1983, Dooly the Dinosaur was first published in Bomulseom.

In 1995, Kim Soo-jung established a company named 'Dooly World' and went into the character design industry. On April 22, 2013, Google Korea's doodle featured Dooly, Kildong his enemy and his friends Douner, Ddochi and Heedong. This was the 30th anniversary of the creation of Dooly. Dobong-gu opened a Dooly Museum in July 2015.

References

South Korean animators
South Korean animated film directors
Living people
People from Jinju
1950 births
Gyeongsang National University alumni